The Toronto Normal School was a teachers college in Toronto, Ontario, Canada. Opened in 1847, the Normal School was located at Church and Gould streets in central Toronto (after 1852), and was a predecessor to the current Ontario Institute for Studies in Education. The Royal Ontario Museum, the Ontario College of Art & Design and the Ontario Agricultural College all originated at the Normal School's campus and the provincial Department 
of Education was also located there. Officially named St. James Square (and located with the old Toronto St. James Ward), the school became known as "the cradle of Ontario's education system". The school's landmark Gothic-Romanesque building was designed by architects Thomas Ridout and Frederick William Cumberland in 1852. The landmark building was demolished in 1963, but architectural elements of the structure remain on the campus of Toronto Metropolitan University.

Establishment
In the 1830s, the authorities in Upper Canada first recognized the need to establish a normal school in the colony to train teachers. It was not until 1846, however, that Egerton Ryerson issued his landmark report entitled "Report on a System of Public Elementary Education for Upper Canada". In that year, the United Province of Canada passed its School Act of 1846, which provided for initial grant of $6,000 for the construction of a building and for an annual subsidy of $6,000 for maintenance of the school.

On November 1, 1847, the Provincial Normal School, as it was first known, opened in the former Government House of Upper Canada. An accompanying Provincial Model School was opened in 1848, in the renovated Government House stables, was created to provide practical training scenarios.

In 1849, the Parliament Buildings in Montreal were burned down in a riot, and the capital of the Province of Canada was relocated to Toronto. The colonial administration required the use of the old Government House, and the Normal School was temporarily displaced to the former Temperance Hall on Temperance Street.

St. James Square

On July 2, 1851, the cornerstone for a new building was laid by Governor General Lord Elgin, and the Normal (and Model) School building opened in May 1852. The new building was designed to accommodate two hundred teachers-in-training and six hundred pupils. It was situated on a 3.2 hectare (8 acres) site, bounded by Gerrard, Church, Gould and Victoria streets, which Ryerson had acquired for the Normal School at a cost of 4500 pounds. The site was described in 1858 as follows: "The situation is a very beautiful one, being considerably elevated above the business parts of the city, and commanding a fine view of the bay, peninsula and lake."

The property became known as St. James Square, and was soon used for more than teacher training purposes. A  plot was set aside for a botanical garden, with another  reserved for agricultural experiments. The agricultural work on the site prompted the founding of the Ontario Agricultural College in 1874, which later became the University of Guelph.

Ryerson wanted the Normal School to be a focal point of the development of arts and education in Upper Canada. In 1857, Canada's first publicly funded museum, The Museum of Natural History and Fine Arts, was established within the Normal School building, with its initial collection based largely on Egerton Ryerson's own artwork, statuary and scientific apparatus acquired during his trips to Europe. In 1896, the archaeological and ethnographic collections of the Canadian Institute Museum of Toronto, headed by David Boyle, were transferred to the Normal School as the Ontario Provincial Museum (or alo as Provincial Museum of Ontario). Boyle was also involved with the archaeological collections of the Ministry of Education (Ontario Archaeological Museum) and remained Ontario Provincial Museum's curator and later its superintendent until his death in 1911. The museum later evolved into the Royal Ontario Museum.

The Ontario Society of Artists, founded in 1872, used the Normal School as its headquarters. The Society operated an art school on the St. James Square site, which eventually became the Ontario College of Art & Design.

The building also housed the Province's Department of Education. These various activities at St. James Square lead to its designation as "the cradle of Ontario's education system".

With the construction of its new building, the name of the Normal School was changed to the Normal School for Upper Canada. Upon Confederation in 1867, it was renamed the Normal School for Ontario. The opening of the Ottawa Normal School in 1875 prompted a further renaming to Toronto Normal School. It was known by this name for 78 years, when the Government of Ontario eliminated the "normal school" nomenclature for its teacher training institutions, and the school became the Toronto Teachers' College in 1953.

Transition years

As it had almost a century before, turmoil again led to the eviction of the Normal School from its facilities. Due to the demands of the Second World War, the Normal School was forced to relocate to the former Earl Kitchener Public School at Pape and Mortimer Avenues in nearby East York in 1941. The model school was dissolved. St. James Square became the No. 6 Initial Training Centre for the Royal Canadian Air Force, and a number of barracks and other auxiliary buildings were constructed on the site.

After the war, the St. James Square property was given to the new Toronto Training and Re-establishment Institute in 1945, a joint-venture of the federal and provincial governments to train ex-servicemen and women. The institute became Ryerson Institute of Technology in 1948, and would ultimately become today's Toronto Metropolitan University. The Normal School building was renamed Ryerson Hall in 1948, with the founding of the Ryerson Institute.  The beginnings of the new institution were inauspicious: one local media report described the new Ryerson Institute as consisting of "a dirty, old three-storey building the Normal School building surrounded by asbestos-sided shacks the war-time buildings."

Meanwhile, the new Toronto Teachers' College (formerly the Normal School) moved into a new facility at Carlaw and Mortimer Avenues in East York in 1955. With the move the Model School was dissolved with the creation of the Ontario Institute for Studies in Education (OISE). The Toronto Teachers' College was absorbed into the new Ontario Teacher Education College in 1974. This college granted a post graduate degree and was the only government college left in Ontario. In 1979, the Ontario Teacher Education College was closed by the Ministry of Education and ceased to exist, merging into the Faculty of Education at the University of Toronto which eventually merged with the Ontario Institute for Studies in Education.

Demolition of St. James Square buildings

The growing Ryerson Institute soon outgrew the ageing St. James Square buildings. The former Normal School building and  surrounding structures were demolished between 1958 and 1963, and replaced by the Kerr Hall quadrangle building. A two-storey portion of the Normal School front façade was preserved (later named the Arch) and currently forms the entrance to the Toronto Metropolitan University Recreation and Athletics Centre.

See also
 List of oldest buildings and structures in Toronto

References

Demolished buildings and structures in Toronto
Toronto Metropolitan University
Defunct universities and colleges in Canada
OCAD University
Elementary schools in Toronto
Terminating vistas in Canada
1847 establishments in Canada
Educational institutions established in 1847
Teachers colleges in Canada
Buildings and structures demolished in 1963
Royal Ontario Museum
Ontario Agricultural College